Kristin Carlson Gore (born June 5, 1977) is an American author and screenwriter. She is the second daughter of former U.S. vice president Al Gore and advocate Tipper Gore (née Aitcheson).

Early life 
Gore was born in Carthage, Tennessee. She has three siblings, sisters Karenna and Sarah, and brother Albert III. Gore was raised in Washington, D.C. She graduated from National Cathedral School in 1995 and Harvard University in 1999. While at Harvard, she was an editor for The Harvard Lampoon, and, until her senior year, was the only woman on its literary board.

Career
Gore has published three novels, Sammy's Hill (2004), Sammy's House (2007), and Sweet Jiminy (2011). She co-wrote the screenplay for the 2015 film Accidental Love, and the narration for the 2007 documentary Arctic Tale. She was also a writer for the animated sitcom Futurama and the long-running sketch comedy series Saturday Night Live.

In 1999, Gore sang backup vocals on a Diva Zappa comedy single called "When The Bell Drops" about Zappa's "hunt for someone to make out with on the Millennium". Tipper Gore played drums on the recording.

In 2013, she worked on Spike Jonze's film Her. Gore has written a screenplay called Racing Dreams, with Lance Acord attached to direct.

Personal life 
Gore married Paul Cusack, a former district director for former Massachusetts United States Representative Marty Meehan, in 2005. The couple divorced in 2009. Since 2016, Gore has been married to musician Damian Kulash. They have two children.

Works 
 Sammy's Hill (2005)
 Sammy's House (2007)
 Sweet Jiminy (2011)

References

External links 

 

1977 births
21st-century American novelists
21st-century American screenwriters
21st-century American women writers
American women novelists
American television writers
Children of vice presidents of the United States
Kristin
The Harvard Lampoon alumni
Living people
American women television writers
People from Carthage, Tennessee
Novelists from Tennessee
Writers Guild of America Award winners
American women screenwriters
National Cathedral School alumni
Screenwriters from Tennessee
Screenwriters from Washington, D.C.